The Port of Hualien is an international port on the Pacific Ocean in Hualien City, Hualien County, Taiwan. Its artificial harbor protected by breakwaters was built in 1930–1939. There are 25 wharves in Hualien Port. The annual container volume is about 13 million tons. The port mainly transports local gravel, cement, and marble, and is host to cruise ships and whale watching boats.

The port is operated by the Taiwan International Ports Corporation which is the state-owned harbor management company.

History
The Port of Hualien was constructed from 1930 to 1939 (Japanese rule), for carrying local granulated sugar to Japan and transporting island-round cargo. The government declared it one of the four international harbors on 1 September 1963. The harbor facilities were improved in an expansion project in 1991.

Sister ports
The Port of Hualien has the following Sister Port agreements:

  Brownsville, Texas
  Long Beach, California
  Ishigaki, Okinawa

See also
 List of East Asian ports
 Transportation in Taiwan

References

External links

 

1939 establishments in Taiwan
Buildings and structures in Hualien County
Hualien
Transportation in Hualien County
Hualien City